Gibraltar has competed at seventeen Commonwealth Games, having attended every Games since 1958. Even so, no athlete representing Gibraltar has won a Commonwealth medal to date.

See also
Gibraltar at the European Championships
Sport in Gibraltar

References

 
Nations at the Commonwealth Games
National sports teams of Gibraltar